"Heaven" is the debut single by South Korean singer Ailee for her extended play Invitation (2012). Recorded in two languages (Korean and Japanese), the Korean version premiered as the lead single from the EP through YMC Entertainment on February 9, 2012, while the Japanese standalone CD single was released on November 6, 2013, via Warner Music Japan. An R&B, soul and dance number, the track was written and produced by Wheesung with additional songwriting contributions from Iggy and Seo Yong-bae.

Following its release, "Heaven" experienced commercial success in South Korea, peaking at number three on both the Gaon Digital Chart and Billboard K-pop Hot 100 chart. It garnered over 3,220,000 digital downloads in the country during 2012, and was the sixth most-downloaded single of the year. In contrast to its success in South Korea, however, "Heaven" performed rather moderately in Japan. The single peaked at number 24 on the Oricon Singles Chart and sold just over 4,000 physical copies in the country.

Critical reception
Writing for music webzine IZM, Shin Hyun-tae praised Ailee's vocal abilities in the track and complimented her technique and charisma. Shin further wrote that the R&B dance song was reminiscent of works by Beyonce and Rihanna, with the "appealing voice, dreamy atmosphere, and magnificent development adding to the charm of the song." The publication included "Heaven" on their list of the best singles released during the year in South Korea; critic Eunji Yoon believed that the success of the song was purely the result of her strong vocal talent and skills, rather than relying on visual decorations that overwhelm the auditory sense or hailing from a major agency in the industry.

Commercial performance
Commercially, "Heaven" experienced success in South Korea. In its debut week, the track opened at number 24 on the Gaon Digital Chart, and subsequently rose to number seven the following week. In its third charting week, the song peaked at the number three position on the digital chart. Throughout the rest of the year, "Heaven" garnered a cumulative total of 3,227,917 digital downloads in the country, and ranked as the sixth best-selling song of 2012 on the year-end download chart. Factoring together digital downloads, streaming figures, and instrumental track sales, the song ranked number nine on the year-end digital ranking for 2012.

Music video and promotion
On February 6, the music video teaser for "Heaven" was released. Later that day, she made her debut stage performance on M Countdown, and subsequently appeared on Show! Music Core on February 11.

Accolades

Track listing
Digital download / streaming – Korean
 "Heaven" – 3:38

Japanese CD single
 "Heaven" – 3:46
 "Starlight" – 5:10
 "Heaven" (Korean version) – 3:36
 "Heaven" (Backing Track) – 3:44
 "Starlight" (Backing Track) – 5:09

Limited edition DVD – Japanese
 "Heaven" (Music video)	 
 "Heaven" (Making)

Charts

Weekly charts

Year-end charts

Sales

Release history

References 

2012 debut singles
2013 singles
2012 songs
K-pop songs
Warner Music Japan singles